Vladyslav Anatoliyovych Hromenko (born 16 December 2002) is a Ukrainian football midfielder who plays for Hirnyk-Sport Horishni Plavni.

Career
Born in Pyriatyn, Hromenko is a product of the local youth sportive school and Vorskla Poltava system.

Hromenko was a member of Ukrainian Premier League clubs Vorskla and Olimpik Donetsk, but he not made his debut for Vorskla or Olimpik in the Ukrainian Premier League, but only played in the Ukrainian Premier League Reserves.

References

External links

2002 births
Living people
People from Pyriatyn
Ukrainian footballers
Association football midfielders
FC Vorskla Poltava players
FC Olimpik Donetsk players
FC Rubikon Kyiv players
FC Hirnyk-Sport Horishni Plavni players
Ukrainian Second League players
Sportspeople from Poltava Oblast